Sally L. Wood is an engineer at Santa Clara University. She became a fellow of the Institute of Electrical and Electronics Engineers in 2003. Her research focuses on Image and signal processing, computational imaging and super-resolution, and engineering education. In 2009, the Electrical and Computer Engineering Division of American Society for Engineering Education gave her the Distinguished Educator Award.

She received her Ph.D. at Stanford University in 1978, her M.S. from Stanford University in 1975, and her B.S. from Columbia University in 1969.

References

External links 

 Dr. Wood's faculty profile
 

21st-century American women
20th-century American women
American women engineers
American women academics
Fellow Members of the IEEE
Santa Clara University faculty
Stanford University School of Engineering alumni
Columbia School of Engineering and Applied Science alumni
Year of birth missing (living people)
Living people